Harpalus hiekei is a species of ground beetle in the subfamily Harpalinae. It was described by Kataev & Wrase in 2010.

References

hiekei
Beetles described in 2010